Nyree Osieck (born 30 December 1976) is a former Australian rugby union player. She made her test debut for Australia against the touring English side in 2001 at Sydney. She was selected for the Wallaroos 2002 Rugby World Cup squad to compete in Spain.

In 2000, Osieck played for the Lady Waratahs team against the Auckland Storm in a Super 12 curtain raiser at Eden Park.

References 

1976 births
Living people
Australian female rugby union players
Australia women's international rugby union players